Robocon (short for Robotic Contest) is organised by Asia-Pacific Broadcasting Union (ABU), a collection of over 20 countries of Asia Pacific Region. NHK, Japan had already been organising such contests at national level and also became the host of the first ABU Robocon in 2002. Since then, every year one of the member broadcasters hosts this international event. 

The broadcasters of each participant country are responsible for conduct of their national contests to select the team which will represent their country in the International Contest. Teams from engineering and technological colleges are eligible for participation. Participating Teams are expected to design and fabricate their own robots and organize their teams including an Instructor, Team Leader, Manual Robot Operator and an Automatic Robot Operator.

National Contest

Doordarshan, the national public service broadcaster organises National Robocon event every year and the winning team gets an opportunity to represent India at the international competition. First Robocon contest was held in 2002, in which only four teams from three colleges had participated at IIT Kanpur. Going from strength to strength, this number has reached 66 in Indian National Robocon 2012 and 107 in 2018 held at the Boxing Arena of Shree Shiv Chhatrapati Sports Complex, Balewadi, Pune. 

Mumbai Kendra of Doordarshan organised National Robocon from 2005 to 2018. The initiative was taken by Mr Mukesh Sharma, the Director of Doordarshan Kendra Mumbai.

Every year finals of Robocon India are held on First Saturday of March. The best engineering institutes across the country compete with each other for the honour of representing Indian National team at the International version of the competition for three gruelling days.

Elimination rounds are held on days preceding the First Saturday of March. This routine schedule been fixed in India through mutual consultations of participating colleges and Doordarshan of India. International Contests are held in August every year when the national contests of all the countries have been completed and their representatives selected. The host country has the privilege of fielding two teams. India hosted its first international contest in August 2008 in the MIT Sports grounds, Pune. In 2014 again, India hosted the international contest on August 24. For the last four years the National Robotics Championship has been organized in the famous Shree Shiv Chhatrapati Sports Complex, Mahalunge, Balewadi, Pune.

Being the leading broadcaster in India, Doordarshan has been instrumental in providing wide coverage and public reach to Robocon.

Robocon India 2023 
Cambodia is ready to host ABU Robocon 2023.The Ministry of Information of Cambodia will officially become the host of the ABU Asia-Pacific Robot Contest (ABU Robocon) to be held in August 2023 with the participation of some 20 countries.

Cambodia will host the ABU Robocon, a historical event in 2023 this year.
Cambodia is planning a game of ‘Robots sprinkle flowers on Angkor Wat Temple’ or ‘Robots toss rings at a pole’, the combination of Cambodia’s blessing dance and the popular game of coin toss.

Robocon India 
 Recent Competitions 
 Robocon India 2022 

 Awards DD-ROBOCON 2022 Awards:Winner: Institute of Technology, Nirma University, Ahmedabad1st Runner Up - Government College of Engineering and Research, Avasari. Government College of Engineering and Research, Avasari2nd Runner Up -Pimpri Chinchwad College Of Engineering, Pune. Pimpri Chinchwad College Of Engineering, PuneHelping Hand AwardsHelping Hand Award (RS 25,000 INR Cash prize) to MIT World Peace (MIT-WPU) University Pune.
Helping Hand Award (RS 20,000 INR Cash prize) to Parul University.fusion Design Awards:fusion Design Award (RS 30,000 INR) to Team KJSCE Robocon from KJ Somaiya College of Engineering.
fusion Impact Award (RS 40,000 INR)  to team PU Robocon from Parul University.Special Awards:Visvesvaraya Award (RS 1,00,000 INR) for the Best Design to GTU Robotics Club from Gujarat Technical University. 
PARAM Award (RS 75,000 INR) for the Best Software to BRACT's Vishwakarma Institute of Technology. 
Ashoka Award (RS 50,000 INR) for the Best Aesthetics to Team Rudra from Marathwada Mitra Mandal's College of Commerce.Other Awards:Best Report Award to Padmabhooshan Vasantdada Patil Institute of Technology - (PVPIT) Bavdhan, Pune.
IHSC Award to MIT World Peace University, Pune.
Best software fusion Design to National Institute of Technology Durgapur.
Abdul Kalam Award - for the Best New Team  to Panchjanya from Birla Vishvakarma Mahavidyalaya.

 Robocon India 2021 

With the 20th anniversary of the ABU ROBOCON the organizing committee brings you the most exciting theme based on the game of “Throwing Arrows” from ancient china. The theme challenges teams to play the ancient game by using the robots equipped with the modern technology. The game will be between two teams having two robots each.

•Winner: Nirma University (ITNU)

 Robocon India 2020 Winner: MIT World Peace University, Pune (MTT)Robocon India 2019

The National ABU Robocon 2019 was held in the Lecture Hall Complex of IIT Delhi. Final match was played between L. D. Engineering College, Ahmedabad and Institute of Technology, Nirma University, Ahmedabad on 16 June 2019. L. D. Engineering College, Ahmedabad won the National level Robocon 2019 contest. Nirma University was first runners up and Gujarat Technological University was second runners up. International contest of ABU Robocon 2019 is going to be held at Ulaanbaatar, Mongolia. The theme is "Sharing the knowledge". It is related to the Urtuu system of Mongolian tradition. The winning team will be represent India at Mongolia for International Robocon contest.

The host of Robocon 2019 was IIT Delhi and the format of game is also changed. The format of Robocon 2019 consists of three stages. Teams from across the nation opposed theis new format, This new format is not allowing all teams to took part in Robocon 2019, only the qualifying teams after stage 1 and 2 are allowed to took part.

The Robocon event has stopped after 2019 
In first stages the evolution is based on the report and Cad Model submitted. Total Marks 100.

 Solution Ideas (20 Marks)
 Design Detail Document (40 Marks)
 CAD Modeling (40 Marks)

Total 86 teams participated in Stage one, out of 86 teams 54 teams were qualified for stage 2.

In second stage evolution is based on the video of actual robots performing different task as per rule-book of ABU Robocon 2019. Total Marks 100.

 Shagai Placing and Throwing (20 Marks)
 Gerege passing mechanism (20 Marks)
 Movement of MR1 - Manual Robot (20 Marks)
 Movement of MR2 - Autonomous Bot (40 Marks)

From 54 teams 26 teams were qualified for the actual competition held at IIT Delhi.

The third stage is the actual competition held at Lecture Hall Complex of IIT Delhi on 16 June 2019. Eight teams were finalized for the quarterfinals based on their points in league matches.Awards Judges Special Award 1: IIT Roorkee Judges Special Award 2: Government College of Engineering and Research, Avasari Best Report Award + 10,000 INR Cash + Book "Introduction to Robotics" By Prof. SK Saha : Sardar Patel College of Engineering, Mumbai Springer 100 Euro Book Coupon Award: All the Quarter Finalists 
 MathWorks Modelling Award:1st Winner: 35,000 INR : Government College of Engineering, Aurangabad
 2nd Winner: 20,000 INR : Pimpri Chinchwad College Of Engineering, Pune
 3rd Winner: 10,000 INR: COLLEGE OF ENGINEERING PUNE (COEP) DD-ROBOCON 2019 Awards: 
 Winner: L. D. College of Engineering, Ahmedabad 1st Runner Up: Institute of Technology, Nirma University, Ahmedabad 2nd Runner Up: Gujarat Technological University (GTU), Team A Prof. Balakrishna Memorial Award (For the Winner): L. D. College of Engineering, Ahmedabad Robocon India 2018 
The National ABU Robocon 2018 was held in the Badminton Hall of the Shree Shiv Chhatrapati Sports Complex, Balewadi, Pune on the 1–3 March 2018. The theme for Robocon 2018 declared as ném còn (throwing shuttlecock). The goal of the game is to throw the shuttlecocks through the ring at height. In Vietnamese culture, the game is about celebration and making friendship.

Institute of Technology, Nirma University, Ahmedabad won the National ABU Robocon 2018 Contest. MIT Tech Team from Maharashtra Institute of Technology, Pune, was the first runner-up and K J Somaiya Institute of Engineering and Information Technology, Mumbai, was the second runner up. L D Engineering College, Ahmedabad won the best idea award. IIT Roorkee won the best innovative design award. Neotech Institute of Technology, Vadodara  Won Rookie award.

 Robocon India 2017 

The National ABU Robocon 2017 took place in the Shri Shiv Chhatrapati Krida Sankul, Pune on 2–4 March 2017. The contest theme has been declared as "Asobi : The Landing Disc”. College of Engineering, Pune won the National ABU Robocon 2017 Contest. Maharashtra Institute of Technology, Pune, was the first runner-up.

 Robocon India 2016 
The National ABU Robocon 2016 took place in the Shri Shiv Chhatrapati Krida Sankul, Pune on 3–5 March 2016. The theme for Robocon 2016 has been declared as 'Chai-Yo : Clean Energy Recharging the World'. Vadodara Institute of Engineering, Vadodara won the National ABU Robocon 2016 Contest. College of Engineering, Pune, was the first runner-up.

 Robocon India 2015 
The National ABU Robocon 2015 took place in the Badminton Hall of the Shree Shiv Chhatrapati Sports Complex, Balewadi, Pune on 7 March 2015. The theme for Robocon 2015 has been declared by Televisi Republik Indonesia (TVRI) as "Robomintion: Badminton Robo-Game". Institute of Technology, Nirma University, Ahmedabad won the National ABU Robocon 2015 Contest and were the first runners-up. Muffakham Jah College of Engineering and Technology (MJCET) stood third in the country and was also awarded the ‘Best Design and Aesthetics’ robot at the Asia Pacific Broadcasting Union Robotics Contest (ABU Robocon) 2015 held at Maharashtra Institute of Technology, Pune. U.V.Patel College of Engineering, Mehsana, Gujarat won the Best IDEA Award.

 Robocon India 2014 
The National ABU Robocon 2014 was held in the Badminton Hall of the Shree Shiv Chhatrapati Sports Complex, Balewadi, Pune on the 6, 7 & 8 March 2014. The theme for Robocon 2014 declared by MITAOE was "A SALUTE TO PARENTHOOD". Institute of Technology, Nirma University, Ahmedabad won the National Contest while Veermata Jijabai Technological Institute (VJTI), Mumbai were the First Runner-up. Both these Institutes got the chance to represent India in the International Contest. MIT Robocon Tech Team representing Maharashtra Institute of Technology, Pune were the Second Runner-up.

The International ABU Robocon 2014 was held in India. Lạc Hồng University, Vietnam won the International ABU Robocon 2014 held at Balewadi, Pune.

 Robocon India 2013 
The National ABU Robocon 2013 was held in the Badminton Hall of the Shree Shiv Chhatrapati Sports Complex, Balewadi, Pune. MIT Tech Team from Maharashtra Institute of Technology won the contest and represented India in the international contest.

The International ABU Robocon 2013 was held in Danang, Vietnam. The Theme for Robocon 2013 declared by VTV was "The Green Planet".
The International ABU Robocon 2013 was won by Kanazawa Institute of Technology, Japan.

 Robocon India 2012 
The National ABU Robocon 2012 was held in the Boxing Arena of The Shree Shiv Chhatrapati Sports Complex, Balewadi, Pune. MIT Tech Team from Maharashtra Institute of Technology won the contest and represented India in the international contest and L.D College of Engineering won the best innovative design award.

The theme for Robocon 2012 declared by Hong Kong, "Peng On Dai Gat".
It was won by University of Electronic Science and Technology of China.

 Robocon India 2011 
The Theme for Robocon 2011 declared by Thailand was Krathong, Lighting Happiness with Friendship. 
It was won by Institute of Technology, Nirma University and this institute got a chance to represent India at International Robocon 2011.
The winner was Dhurakij Pundit University coming from Thailand.

 Robocon India 2010. 

The theme for Robocon 2010 declared by Egypt was Robo-Pharaohs Build Pyramids. 
It was won by MIT Robocon Tech Team from MIT Pune.

 Robocon India 2009 
Theme of Kago, the traditional Japanese palanquin, carried by human beings replaced by robots.
It was won by IIT Madras.

 Robocon India 2008 
The Theme for Robocon 2008 declared by India was Govinda, a traditional Indian Deity who used to play earthly games by capturing butter/cheese from heads of Gopis.
It was won by Institute of Technology, Nirma University, Ahmedabad. Runner-up was MIT Robocon Tech Team from MIT Pune. Both team got to represent India in ABU Robocon as host country gets an opportunity to be represented by two teams.

 Robocon India 2007 
It was won by IIT, Delhi.

 Robocon India 2006 

 Robocon India 2005 
Total 14 teams participated in the contest held on 24–25 June 2005 at MIT, Pune. The theme was "Climb The Great Wall And Light The Holy Fire".

It was won by IIT Bombay.

 Robocon India 2004 
Total 12 teams participated in the contest held on 26–27 June 2004 at Institute of Technology, Nirma University, Ahmedabad. The theme was "Reunion of Separated Lovers, ‘Gyeonu and Jingnyeo".

It was won by VESIT, Mumbai, while L. D. college of Engineering, Ahmedabad was runner-up.

 Awards 
Most Aesthetically Built Robot               : Vivekanand Education Society's Institute Of Technology, Mumbai

Most Functional Robot                           : L. D. college of Engineering, Ahmedabad

Most Innovative Design                          : Institute of Technology, Nirma University, Ahmedabad

Consolation Prize for Simplest Design  : U. V. Patel College of Engineering, Mehsana

 Robocon India 2003 
Total seven teams from five different universities participated in the contest held on 13–14 July 2003 at Nirma Institute, Ahmedabad. The theme was “Takraw Space Conqueror”.

It was won by Institute of Technology, Nirma University, Ahmedabad.

 Robocon India 2002 
Four teams from three different universities participated in the contest held at IIT Kanpur on July 20–21, 2002. The theme was “Reach for the top of Mt. Fuji”' and the participating teams were VESIT, Mumbai; IIT Kanpur and Institute of Technology, Nirma University, Ahmedabad.

It was won by Institute of Technology, Nirma University, Ahmedabad.

Results

References

External links 

 Official site (International)
 Robocon India 2019

Robotics competitions
Recurring events established in 2002